The 1968 Westminster Council election took place on 9 May 1968 to elect members of Westminster City Council in London, England. The whole council was up for election and the Conservative party stayed in overall control of the council.

Background

Election result

Ward results

References

Election, 1968
Westminster
Westminster City Council election